Annibale Gatti (September, 1828 – 1909) was an Italian painter, known for history painting and fresco decoration in Tuscany.

Biography

He was born in Forlì. He moved to Florence by 1830. In 1843, he enrolled in the Academy of Fine Arts of Florence. He became friends with the architect Giuseppe Poggi, and was employed in numerous restoration projects in Tuscany. He frescoed for the Palazzo Lanfranchi-Toscanelli in Pisa. In 1861, he decorated the Throne Room in the Pitti Palace. He decorated the ceiling of the Teatro Verdi in Pisa, where he also painted the sipario (or theater curtain). He became professor in the Florentine Academy and appointed Knight of the Order of the Crown of Italy.

Among his other works are the following:
Rinaldo and Armida and Armida coi duci arabi, (ceiling of Palazzo Favard, Florence)
Molière reads his comedies to the serva 
Transport of the Cadaver of Verdiana da Castelfiorentino, (1872) Gold medal in Florence) 
Lafayette and Washington (awarded in Boston) 
Leonardo da Vinci at the court of Lodovico il Moro
Goldoni his comedies in Gardens of the Palazzo Scotto in Pisa 
Galileo receives Milton (Wellcome Library)
Paesiello 
The Master of All Our Seeing
Frieze (Ballroom of Villino Stibbert, Florence).

References

External links

1828 births
1909 deaths
People from Forlì
19th-century Italian painters
Italian male painters
Accademia di Belle Arti di Firenze alumni
Painters from Florence
19th-century Italian male artists